Yevgeni Aleksandrovich Pesikov (born 6 April 1999) is a Russian football player. He plays for FC Veles Moscow.

Club career
He made his debut in the Russian Football National League for FC Yenisey Krasnoyarsk on 14 August 2019 in a game against FC Shinnik Yaroslavl, as a starter.

References

External links
 Profile by Russian Football National League
 
 

1999 births
Sportspeople from Krasnoyarsk
Living people
Russian footballers
Association football midfielders
FC Yenisey Krasnoyarsk players
FC Veles Moscow players
Russian First League players
Russian Second League players